Gerak Khas The Movie is a 2001 Malaysian Malay-language action thriller film written, directed and produced by Yusof Haslam, based on the Malaysian television series, Gerak Khas. The film was released on 1 March 2001 and starring Yusof himself, AC Mizal, Abby Abadi, Erra Fazira, Rosyam Nor, Norman Hakim and Nasha Aziz. The movie was a commercial success and spawned two more sequels—Gerak Khas the Movie II (2002) and GK3 the Movie (2005).

Plot
Two police Inspectors—Mazlan (AC Mizal) and Aleeza (Abby Abadi) helmed the Gerak Khas unit, which was set up to crippled major crime syndicates dealing in pirated porn VCDs and ecstasy pills. Both rival syndicates are headed by Castello (Rosyam Nor) and Rafayel (Norman Hakim). Things getting complicated by the arrival of new police officer, Inspector Shafikah (Erra Fazira) and a TV journalist, Azura (Normala Samsudin) who worked at the TVKL.

Cast

Production
Principal photography of the film began circa September and October 2000. The filming cost is approximately priced RM1.3 million. Malaysian singer, Illa Sabry made an uncredited cameo appearance in the film as a band singer.

Music
The soundtrack album for Gerak Khas the Movie was released on February 6, 2001 by Nova Music. "Keranamu Kekasih" performed by Illa Sabry and "Keliru" by AC Mizal was the lead singles for the soundtrack.

Sequels
A second sequel, Gerak Khas the Movie II was released in 2002, directly after the success of the first film, later followed by the third and last sequel, GK3 the Movie (also known as Gerak Khas the Movie III) was released in 2005.

Awards and nominations

See also
 Gerak Khas (TV series)

References

External links
 

Films directed by Yusof Haslam
Films produced by Yusof Haslam
Films with screenplays by Yusof Haslam
Skop Productions films
2001 action films
2001 films
Malaysian action films